, real name
, born May 13, 1984, is a female Japanese singer-songwriter from Utsunomiya. She is mostly known for her songs used in Japanese television shows, including several that had made the Oricon charts, and for her song "Break the Cocoon", which was used as ending theme in the anime series Speed Grapher.

She has been working for the record company EMI Music Japan, record labels Virgin Music, Pure Music and Watanabe Entertainment before turning independent in 2013.

Discography

Singles

  (March 30, 2005)
 Break the Cocoon (July 21, 2005) — Speed Grapher anime ending theme song
  (November 2, 2005)
HIKARI —    ending theme song
Daia no Hana — Black Cat anime opening theme song
  (January 18, 2006)
  (November 14, 2007)

Albums
Indies (then known as より子。) 
 (March 29, 2002, reissued: July 24, 2002) highest  Oricon ranking: 26th
Tracks were used on several TV shows on Fuji TV channels:
"Plume Radio":  (ending theme song)
"No name"： (insert song)
gap (November 29, 2002, mini album) highest Oricon ranking: 86th. Oricon indies chart: 4th
"gap": TBS show Count Down TV (ending theme song)

Post-indies
Cocoon (January 26, 2005) highest Oricon ranking: 24th
second VERSE (February 16, 2006) highest Oricon ranking: 78th
 (January 16, 2008)
 (December 1, 2010)
My Soul (February 13, 2012)

External links
 Official MySpace account
 Official homepage Yori-suta
 Official YouTube channel

1984 births
Living people
People from Utsunomiya, Tochigi
Musicians from Tochigi Prefecture
21st-century Japanese singers